Expo Tel Aviv (formerly the Israel Trade Fairs and Convention Center and later the Tel Aviv Convention Center, commonly referred to as Ganei HaTaarucha  (lit. "Exhibition Gardens") or the Tel Aviv Fairgrounds, is a fairground complex on Rokach Boulevard in northern Tel Aviv, Israel used as a venue for concerts, exhibitions, trade fairs and conferences.

Established in 1932 as Yerid HaMizrach at the site of the Levant Fair, near the Tel Aviv Port, the fairgrounds moved to their present location at 101 Rokach Boulevard (near the Yarkon Park and Tel Aviv University) in 1959. The site is directly accessible from the Ayalon Highway, Tel Aviv’s main transportation artery, as well as from the Tel Aviv University railway station.

Expo Tel Aviv hosts up to 2.5 million visitors and between 45 and 60 major events annually. The fairground has ten halls and pavilions and a large outdoor space including an amusement park known as the Luna Park. Nearby is the Drive in Arena which was built on the grounds of what was once Israel's only drive-in theater.

Between 14 and 18 May, the fairground hosted the 2019 Eurovision Song Contest. The venue has been renamed Expo Tel Aviv (International Convention Center).
It also hosted the 2022 Tel Aviv Open, Israel's first major tennis tournament since 1996.

History

The Levant Fair was an international fair site next to the Tel Aviv Port established in 1933 to showcase the accomplishments of the pre-state Jewish community in the sphere of industry. After the success of the first fair, permanent structures were built on a plot of land at the northern end of Dizengoff street on the banks of the Yarkon River.

Fairs were held in 1934 and 1936 with pavilions and halls constructed for the participating countries. The chief architect was Aryeh Elhanani. A flying camel became the official logo. Richard Kauffmann planned the pavilion layout. Other leading architects were Arieh Sharon and Joseph Neufeld. The pavilions were designed in the International Style.

In 1959, the fairgrounds were moved to their present location on Rokach Boulevard, and the new site was inaugurated with an exhibition marking Tel Aviv's 50th Jubilee. In 1983, the convention center opened within the fairgrounds and at the end of 2003 the "Pavilion No. 1" was opened. It has 20,000 m² of exhibition space and is the largest object of its kind in Israel and in the Eastern Mediterranean.

In 2010, the "round pavilion" in the fairground was demolished. In its place began the construction of a new 10,000-seat congress and convention center called "Bitan 2" (Pavilion 2), which was inaugurated in January 2015. The new pavilion hosted the 2018 European Judo Championships from 26–28 April.

Entertainment
In recent years, the center has been used for many musical concerts and shows.

On 13 September 2018, the European Broadcasting Union (EBU) & Israeli broadcaster Israeli Public Broadcasting Corporation (KAN) announced that the center would host the Eurovision Song Contest 2019. The semi-finals were held on 14 and 16 May 2019, with the final taking place on 18 May 2019. The IPBC expected Pavilion 2 to have room for up to 9,000 attendees.

See also
 Culture of Israel
 Tourism in Israel

References

External links

Buildings and structures in Tel Aviv
Tourist attractions in Tel Aviv
Convention centers in Israel
Sports venues in Tel Aviv